Planada (Spanish for "Plain") is a census-designated place (CDP) in Merced County, California, United States. The population was 4,164 at the 2020 census, down from 4,584 at the 2010 census.

History
Planada was originally named Whitton by railroad officials. The area's first white settlers were a group of Swiss dairy farmers, who renamed the settlement Geneva. The Geneva post office opened in 1896, closed in 1897, then reopened in 1898. In 1911, it held a contest to select a new name for the town, and Planada was the winning entry.  The San Francisco and San Joaquin Valley Railroad (built in the late 1890s) had a "Geneva" station which became the "Planada" station.

Geography
California State Route 140 passes through the community, leading west  to Merced and northeast  to Mariposa in the foothills of the Sierra Nevada.

Climate
According to the Köppen Climate Classification system, Planada has a warm-summer Mediterranean climate, abbreviated "Csa" on climate maps.

Demographics

2010
At the 2010 census Planada had a population of 4,584. The racial makeup of Planada was 1,681 (36.7%) White, 22 (0.5%) African American, 23 (0.5%) Native American, 46 (1.0%) Asian, 1 (0.0%) Pacific Islander, 2,725 (59.4%) from other races, and 86 (1.9%) from two or more races. Hispanic or Latino of any race were 4,347 persons (94.8%).

The whole population lived in households, no one lived in non-institutionalized group quarters and no one was institutionalized.

There were 1,115 households, 675 (60.5%) had children under the age of 18 living in them, 737 (66.1%) were opposite-sex married couples living together, 154 (13.8%) had a female householder with no husband present, 111 (10.0%) had a male householder with no wife present.  There were 45 (4.0%) unmarried opposite-sex partnerships, and 9 (0.8%) same-sex married couples or partnerships. 95 households (8.5%) were one person and 35 (3.1%) had someone living alone who was 65 or older. The average household size was 4.11.  There were 1,002 families (89.9% of households); the average family size was 4.30.

The age distribution was 1,552 people (33.9%) under the age of 18, 588 people (12.8%) aged 18 to 24, 1,201 people (26.2%) aged 25 to 44, 876 people (19.1%) aged 45 to 64, and 367 people (8.0%) who were 65 or older.  The median age was 27.1 years. For every 100 females, there were 108.0 males.  For every 100 females age 18 and over, there were 109.2 males.

There were 1,207 housing units at an average density of 765.3 per square mile, of the occupied units 649 (58.2%) were owner-occupied and 466 (41.8%) were rented. The homeowner vacancy rate was 3.4%; the rental vacancy rate was 7.3%.  2,638 people (57.5% of the population) lived in owner-occupied housing units and 1,946 people (42.5%) lived in rental housing units.

2000
At the 2000 census there were 4,369 people, 1,007 households, and 900 families in the CDP. The racial makeup of the CDP was 24.28% White, 0.69% African American, 1.81% Native American, 0.53% Asian, 0.02% Pacific Islander, 67.91% from other races, and 4.76% from two or more races. Hispanic or Latino of any race were 92.10%.

Of the 1,007 households 58.1% had children under the age of 18 living with them, 66.4% were married couples living together, 15.4% had a female householder with no husband present, and 10.8% were non-families. 7.5% of households were one person and 3.3% were one person aged 65 or older.  The average household size was 4.11 and the average family size was 4.28.

The age distribution was 38.8% under the age of 18, 12.2% from 18 to 24, 27.9% from 25 to 44, 14.3% from 45 to 64, and 6.8% 65 or older.  The median age was 24 years. For every 100 females, there were 109.9 males.  For every 100 females age 18 and over, there were 109.6 males.

The median household income was $24,286 and the median family income  was $24,513. Males had a median income of $20,341 versus $20,446 for females. The per capita income for the CDP was $9,864.  About 28.7% of families and 33.9% of the population were below the poverty line, including 38.4% of those under age 18 and 18.8% of those age 65 or over.

Politics

Notable people
The ornithologist Rollo Beck died in Planada in 1950.

References

Census-designated places in Merced County, California
Census-designated places in California